Every Best Single 2 is the second greatest hits compilation of J-pop duo Every Little Thing, released on September 10, 2003 by Avex Trax.

Background 
This album is the second best of collection of Every Little Thing, after Every Best Single +3 released in 1999, and includes all the singles from "Pray" to "Fundamental Love", which was a recut single for the album (although it was later also included in Commonplace). Nevertheless, as bonus tracks it includes two pre-2000 singles, "For the Moment" and "Deatta Koro no Yō ni", in newly recorded acoustic versions.

This compilation was the first release of the band to be released with a bonus DVD (only available in the limited edition).

Reception
The album received the award for "Rock & Pop Album of the Year" at the 18th Japan Gold Disc Awards.

Commercial performance 
The album peaked at number one on the Oricon charts and charted for 38 weeks.

Track listing 

Notes
 co-arranged by Every Little Thing
 co-arranged by Ichiro Ito

Charts

References 

2003 albums
Every Little Thing (band) albums